Uglov is a Russian male surname, its feminine counterpart is Uglova. Notable people with the surname include:

Fyodor Uglov (1904–2008), Soviet and Russian physician
Nikita Uglov (born 1993), Russian sprinter

Russian-language surnames